Inderjit Singh Dhaliwal (born 5 June 1960) is a serial entrepreneur and former politician in Singapore's parliament representing the Ang Mo Kio GRC from 1996 to 2015.

Early life 
Born in Punjab, India, Singh came to Singapore when he was 10 months old.

Education 
Singh attended Kaki Bukit Primary School in Singapore and then progressed to Broadrick Secondary School and Temasek Junior College. He began his university education with a Bachelor of Engineering from Nanyang Technological University (NTU) in Electrical and Electronics. He graduated with honours from the institution in 1985. While at Nanyang Tech he founded the EEE Club and was the first chairman of the NTU Students' Union Council. He also helped start the NTI Alumni Association (later became NTUAC).

After earning his bachelors, he continued his education at the University of Strathclyde in Scotland, earning an MBA in 1991. He received an honorary doctorate from Amity University in 2018.

Career

Corporate career 
Singh began his career with Texas Instruments, beginning as an engineer in 1985 and spent 13 years ascending the corporate ladder before becoming Director of Operations of the Singapore plant from 1996 to 1998. After his stint with Texas Instruments, Singh began a career of entrepreneurship, in which he started six businesses after leaving the corporate arena. He founded the United Test and Assembly Center (UTAC), a semiconductor firm, in 1998 which became a Unicorn valued at US$2b in 2001. The venture was mostly funded by Taiwanese friends of his due to what he terms "a dearth of willing investors and a general disbelief that he would be able to achieve his dream of creating a homegrown multinational firm.". He raised a record of US$138m, all at one go, at the seeds stage in 1998. Inderjit left UTAC in 2001. The firm was listed on the Singapore Stock Exchange in 2004.

Around the same time he started UTAC, he started, Tri-Star, which he started with his brothers as trading and services firm, in which much of his and his family's savings were used to fund the company. Today Tri Star is present in 38 countries in Africa as a distributor of Consumer Electronic products. Inderjit subsequently also set-up semiconductor engineering firm Infiniti Solutions in 2001. Infiniti at its peak had operations in the Silicon Valley, USA, in Austin Texas, a factory in Philippines and with the HQ in Singapore.  More recently, he founded Solstar International, a Singapore-based consumer electronics products company, of which he is currently the CEO. Solstar is a Singapore based Consumer Electronics brand selling in 25 countries in Africa and other developing countries around Asia. In 2009, Inderjit, helped start Urah Transdermal,a Singapore based Life-Science Research and product Company that has Developed and patented technologies for the delivery of active molecules through the skin barriers to biological targets.

He is a Co-President of the World Entrepreneurship Forum, a global organisation on entrepreneurship development. He has also been actively driving the transformation of the entrepreneurship landscape and helping to shape policies to better support start-ups, small and medium businesses in Singapore and has been a board member of Spring Singapore (Enterprise Singapore today) and Vice-Chairman of the Action Community for Entrepreneurship (ACE). He was also a board member of the Urban Redevelopment Authority (URA) for 8 years where he also Chaired the Audit committee of URA.

Inderjit is currently a member of the Board of Trustees of the Nanyang Technological University (NTU) and also is the Chairman of the board of NTUitive, the Innovation company of NTU. He is also the Chairman of the Alumni and Development committee, a board committee of NTU. He is also a member of the International Advisory Panel of EMLyon, a premier business school in France. Inderjit is a board member of the World Business Angel Forum. Inderjit was appointed as an Adjunct Professor by the Nanyang Technological University, College of Engineering in 2019.

He is the author of the popular book, "The Art and Science of Entrepreneurship", which captures his entrepreneurial experiences.

He received the Nanyang Distinguished Alumni award in 2011 from NTU and was awarded the Public Service Medal (Pingat Bakti Masyarakat) in 2016 by the government of Singapore as part of its annual National Day awards. He received the Strathclyde Alumni Distinguished Entrepreneur Award in 2013

Political career 
Singh became an active grassroots leader in 1984. He became a member of parliament for the Kebun Baru ward in the Ang Mo Kio GRC, in the Prime Minister's team, since the 1996 General Elections, and stepped down in 2015. As a member of parliament, Inderjit held various positions. He was a Deputy Government Whip for a number of years and also the Chairman of the Government Parliamentary Committee of the Ministries of Finance and Trade and Industry.

References 

1960 births
Living people
People's Action Party politicians
Singaporean politicians of Indian descent
Singaporean Sikhs
Singaporean people of Indian descent
Singaporean businesspeople
Singaporean engineers
Members of the Parliament of Singapore
Singaporean people of Punjabi descent
Temasek Junior College alumni
Nanyang Technological University alumni
Punjabi people
People from Punjab, India
Alumni of the University of Strathclyde
Singaporean politicians of Punjabi descent
Chief operating officers
Indian emigrants to Singapore
Naturalised citizens of Singapore
Recipients of the Pingat Bakti Masyarakat